Zero is a 2010 Australian stop motion animated short film written and directed by Christopher Kezelos and produced by Christine Kezelos.

Awards, nominations and screenings

Awards
 2010 LA Shorts Fest: Best Animation
 2010 Rhode Island International Film Festival: (tied with) First Place – Best Animation
 2010 Grand OFF – World Independent Film Awards: Best Animation
 2010 ATOM Awards: Best Animation
 2010 Naples International Film Festival: Best Short Film
 2010 Flickerfest International Film Festival: Best Achievement in Sound
 2010 Australian Cinematographers Society: Golden Tripod – Experimental & Specialised (National)
 2009 Australian Cinematographers Society: Gold Award – Experimental & Specialised (NSW/ACT)
 2010 Bondi Short Film Festival: Best Script
 2010 Bondi Short Film Festival: Best Design
 2011 Shorts Film Festival: Bronze Award
 2011 Lady Filmmakers Film Festival: Ladies Kick Butt
 2011 Sandfly Film Festival: Best Animation
 2011 Sandfly Film Festival: Best Australian Short
 2011 Sandfly Film Festival: Best at Sandfly

Nominations
 2010 AFI Awards: Nominated for Best Short Animation
 2010 Inside Film Awards: Nominated for Best Short Animation
 2010 APRA Screen Music Awards: Nominated for Best Music in a Short Film
 2010 Australian Screen Sound Awards: Nominated for Best Sound in an Animated Short Film or Program

Screenings
 2010 Palm Springs International ShortFest & Film Market: Official Selection
 2010 Savannah Film Festival: Official Selection
 2010 Hiroshima International Animation Festival: Official Selection
 2010 Seoul International Cartoon Animation Festival: Official Selection (SICAF Choice)
 2010 Anima Mundi International Animation Festival of Brazil: Official Selection (Panorama) – 2010 Bradford Animation Festival: Official Selection
 2010 St Kilda Film Festival: Official Selection
 2010 Lucania Film Festival: Official Selection
 2010 Australian Effects and Animation Festival: Official Selection
 2010 Anim’est International Animation Film Festival: Official Selection
 2010 Bumbershoot – Seattle Music & Arts Festival: Official Selection
 2010 North Country Film Festival: Official Selection
 2010 ANIMANIMA – International Festival of Animation: Official Selection (Panorama)
 2010 Anaheim International Film Festival: Official Selection
 2010 Foyle Film Festival: Official Selection
 2010 Montreal Stop Motion Film Festival: Official Selection
 2010 Science Fiction + Fantasy Short Film Festival: Official Selection
 2010 Animated Dreams Film Festival: Official Selection
 2010 Etudia&Anima Festival: Official Selection
 2010 Dawn Breakers International Film Festival: Official Selection
 2010 Open Media Festival: Official Selection
 2010 Adelaide Film Festival: Official Selection

References

External links
 Official Homepage

2010s animated short films
Australian animated short films
2010 animated films
2010 films
Stop-motion animated short films
2010 short films
2010s Australian animated films
2010s stop-motion animated films
2010s English-language films